Denílson Pereira Júnior (born 18 July 1995), known simply as Dení Jr, is a Brazilian footballer who plays as a forward for Portuguese club Famalicão.

Club career
Born in Rio de Janeiro, Denílson graduated with Fluminense's youth setup. He made his first team – and Série A – debut on 9 June 2013, coming on as a second half substitute for Biro-Biro and scoring the winner in a 2–1 home success over Goiás.

Denílson appeared in only one more match before returning to the youth setup. On 31 January 2015 he joined Granada CF, being assigned to the reserves in Segunda División B.

On 9 August 2016, Denílson signed a season-long loan deal with Neftchi Baku, scoring once in nine appearances before having his loan deal terminated by Neftchi Baku on 18 November 2016. He then returned to Brazil and had a series of loan spells at Avaí, São Paulo and Vitória between 2017 and 2018.

On 20 June 2018, Denílson joined Atlético Mineiro on a five-year deal. 

On 3 January 2019, Denílson joined Saudi club Al-Faisaly on a six-month loan deal from Atlético. 

On 30 January 2023, Denílson returned to Portugal and signed a year-and-a-half contract with Famalicão.

References

External links

1995 births
Footballers from Rio de Janeiro (city)
Living people
Brazilian footballers
Association football forwards
Fluminense FC players
Club Recreativo Granada players
Neftçi PFK players
Avaí FC players
São Paulo FC players
Esporte Clube Vitória players
Clube Atlético Mineiro players
Al-Faisaly FC players
C.D. Tondela players
F.C. Paços de Ferreira players
Al Dhafra FC players
Hatta Club players
F.C. Famalicão players
Campeonato Brasileiro Série A players
Segunda División B players
Azerbaijan Premier League players
Saudi Professional League players
Primeira Liga players
UAE Pro League players
Brazilian expatriate footballers
Expatriate footballers in Spain
Brazilian expatriate sportspeople in Spain
Expatriate footballers in Azerbaijan
Brazilian expatriate sportspeople in Azerbaijan
Expatriate footballers in Saudi Arabia
Brazilian expatriate sportspeople in Saudi Arabia
Expatriate footballers in Portugal
Brazilian expatriate sportspeople in Portugal
Expatriate footballers in the United Arab Emirates
Brazilian expatriate sportspeople in the United Arab Emirates